The Shellman Historic District is a  historic district in Shellman in Randolph County, Georgia which was listed on the National Register of Historic Places in 1985.  It included 163 contributing buildings and a contributing site.

Per its NRHP nomination, "The Shellman Historic District includes Shellman's intact historic, residential, and commercial resources, several historic churches, a railroad depot, and the city cemetery."  It was deemed "historically significant in terms of community planning and development, transportation, architecture, landscape architecture, commerce, and local history."

References

Historic districts on the National Register of Historic Places in Georgia (U.S. state)
Victorian architecture in Georgia (U.S. state)
Neoclassical architecture in Georgia (U.S. state)
National Register of Historic Places in Randolph County, Georgia